Love Bond (Traditional Chinese: 心花放) is a TVB modern drama series broadcast in February 2005.

It is a warm family show which follows two families, the Gei and the Lam, who are neighbors in the same building. This series also marked the fifth collaboration between Michael Tao and Kenix Kwok following the first three installments of the Detective Investigation Files Series and 2004's Shine On You.

Synopsis
Roses represent love while plum blossoms symbolize nobility;
Stars and great actors... Together they show you a family in love!

Cast

The Lam family

The Gei family

Other cast

External links
TVB.com Love Bond - Official Website 
Butterfly's Place.net Love Bond Episodic Synopsis 
SPCNET.tv Love Bond - Reviews 

TVB dramas
2005 Hong Kong television series debuts
2005 Hong Kong television series endings